The Howard K. Weber House is a historic house located at 925 South 7th Street in Springfield, Illinois. While the house was built in the 1840s, its current design comes from a series of additions and renovations which began in 1878. However artifacts discovered in the basement date around the 1820s. Howard K. Weber, a prominent local banker, started this renovation process shortly after buying the house. The house's new design was primarily Italianate, as the style was then nationally popular; its influence can be seen in the asymmetrical plan, the low hip roof with a bracketed cornice, and the arched windows. The house also exhibits a late Victorian influence in its more detailed elements, particularly the first-floor bay windows and the Gothic moldings on the second floor.

The house was added to the National Register of Historic Places on October 1, 1979.

References

Houses on the National Register of Historic Places in Illinois
Italianate architecture in Illinois
National Register of Historic Places in Springfield, Illinois
Houses in Springfield, Illinois